Nane Raja is a 1984 Indian Kannada-language film, directed by C. V. Rajendran and produced by M. P. Shankar. The film stars V. Ravichandran, Ambika, Jai Jagadish, and Ambareesh. The film's musical score was done by Shankar-Ganesh. The film was remade in Telugu as Chiranjeevi (1985).

Plot
The plot revolves around a man, Raja (Ravichandran), who is the son of a Police commissioner. Raja admires his dad very much. He falls in love with a singer Asha (Ambika), who rejects his love. Raja goes to see Asha in her home one day to convey his love. Asha rejects his love again and belittles Raja and his dad. Hearing her rather rash words at his dad, Raja gets enraged and slaps Asha. In a freak accident, Asha dies immediately. What follows next is a series of murders that Raja commits in his attempt at hiding the accidental death caused by him.

Cast

V. Ravichandran as Raja
Ambika as Asha
Jai Jagadish
Ambareesh in Sp. App.
Kumari Indira
M. P. Shankar
Master Arjun
Shivaram
Mukunda
Somu
H. P. Basavaraj
Chandrashekar
Raghunandan
P. J. Raju
P. J. Dayashankar
P. J. Vishwanath

Soundtrack
The music was composed by Shankar–Ganesh.

References

External links

1984 films
1980s Kannada-language films
Films scored by Shankar–Ganesh
Kannada films remade in other languages
Films directed by C. V. Rajendran